Micrelaps bicoloratus, or the Kenya two-headed snake, is a species of venomous opisthoglyphous (rear-fanged) snake in the family Atractaspididae. It is endemic to Kenya.

References

Sternfeld, R. 1908. Neue und ungenügend bekannte afrikanische Schlangen. Sitzber. Ber. Ges. naturf. Freunde Berlin 4:92-95.

Atractaspididae
Endemic fauna of Kenya
Reptiles described in 1908